Henry Mallet may refer to:

Henry Mallet, character in Spirited
Henry Malet of the Malet Baronets